Stephen T. Jurvetson (born March 1, 1967) is an American businessman and venture capitalist. Formerly a partner of the firm Draper Fisher Jurvetson (DFJ), he was an early investor in Hotmail, Memphis Meats, Mythic and Nervana Systems. He is currently a board member of SpaceX and served on Tesla's board from 2006–2020, among others. He later co-founded the firm Future Ventures with Maryanna Saenko, who worked with him at DFJ.

Early life and education
Jurvetson's father Tõnu Jürvetson fled Estonia through Germany just before Soviet re-occupation in 1944. Tõnu was married to another Estonian immigrant, Tiiu Tia Jürvetson. Even though within the family, the Estonian language was used, Steve never learned it and his parents used it as a secret language between themselves. Steve Jurvetson was the first US-born Estonian to become an e-resident of Estonia.

Jurvetson grew up in Dallas, where he graduated from St. Mark's School of Texas in 1985. At Stanford University, Jurvetson finished his degree in electrical engineering in 2.5 years and graduated No. 1 in his class. He then earned an M.S. in electrical engineering and an M.B.A., also from Stanford. His first job out of Stanford was working as an R&D engineer at Hewlett-Packard (HP). After two years at HP, he moved on as a product marketer at Apple and then NeXT Software.

Jurvetson was named to the MIT TR35 in 1999 to "recognize young entrepreneurs who can deliver", including making the first investment in Hotmail.

Career

As a consultant with Bain & Company, Jurvetson developed marketing, sales, engineering and business strategies for a wide range of companies in the software, networking, and semiconductor industries. He first joined DFJ after his second year of business school, and became a partner after proving his talent on several investments.

At DFJ, Jurvetson was involved in lucrative investments with Hotmail, Interwoven, Kana, Tradex, and Cyras.  Cyras in particular was acquired for 8 billion USD.  Less favorably, DFJ and Jurvetson were an early financial backer of Elizabeth Holmes and her disgraced blood-testing firm Theranos.

Jurvetson was named to Forbes' "Midas List" of Tech's Top Investors in 2011, 2012, 2013, 2014, and 2016. He was a board member of Synthetic Genomics, Planet Labs, Nervana Systems (acquired by Intel), Flux, D-Wave, SpaceX, and Tesla.

Also in 2016, President Barack Obama appointed Jurvetson as a Presidential Ambassador for Global Entrepreneurship.
 
On November 13, 2017, Jurvetson stepped down from his role at DFJ Venture Capital in addition to taking leave from the boards of SpaceX and Tesla following an internal DFJ investigation into allegations of sexual harassment. While there were allegations of inappropriate behavior, DFJ did not receive an official complaint of harassment or misconduct. While the findings of the investigation were not made public, anonymous sources alleged that the investigation "uncovered behaviors by Jurvetson that were unacceptable related to a negative tone toward women entrepreneurs." Jurvetson stated that stepping down from his role was unrelated to the allegations, writing "I am leaving DFJ to focus on personal matters" in a statement posted to Twitter. Recode reported that Jurvetson was placed on a leave of absence and then later voted out of the company. A source familiar with the situation told Recode that the dismissal was triggered by DFJ learning that Jurvetson lied about what it considered "serious allegations." 

Jurvetson cofounded a new venture fund, Future Ventures, in April 2018. The inaugural $200M venture capital fund focuses on environmentally sustainable transportation, food technology and high power computer systems.

Jurvetson was a member of the Tesla board of directors from 2006 to December 2020.

Venture capital investments 
 
 
Boxbe (2005)

See also

References

External links
 
 Personal Flickr page

1967 births
Living people
American company founders
American financial businesspeople
American venture capitalists
American billionaires
Businesspeople in online retailing
Bain & Company employees
Model rocketry
St. Mark's School (Texas) alumni
Stanford Graduate School of Business alumni
Businesspeople from Arizona
American people of Estonian descent
Stanford University School of Engineering alumni
Missing middle or first names
Tesla, Inc. people